Youyu-shi, also called Youyu clan or the Yu dynasty, is a proposed dynasty of China that could have existed prior to the Xia dynasty. The territory controlled by the Yu dynasty is hypothesized to have been located southwest of Pinglu County, in Shanxi Province, China. Its last monarch is believed to be Emperor Shun.

Debate over existence

Evidence in favor
The Yu dynasty was mentioned alongside the Xia, Shang and Zhou dynasties in numerous historical Chinese works, including the Zuo Zhuan, Discourses of the States, Mozi, The Methods of the Sima, Master Lü's Spring and Autumn Annals and the Book of Rites. Based on the available texts, some scholars believe that the Yu dynasty lasted much longer than the reign of the Emperor Shun, and could be comparable in length to the Xia, Shang and Zhou dynasties that succeeded it.

Numerous large-scale urban ruins have been uncovered at the Taosi archaeological site, which is considered to be part of the Neolithic Longshan culture. In particular, palaces and royal tombs were also discovered at Taosi, further proving the possible existence of a dynastic regime based on tribal confederation.

In 2002, Chinese historian Wang Shumin published an academic paper titled "There was a Yu dynasty before Xia, Shang and Zhou" which renewed public interest in the possible existence of a pre-Xia dynastic state in the Yellow River basin.

Evidence against
Like the Xia dynasty, the existence of the Yu dynasty has been debated by historians and scholars. The lack of concrete evidence and archaeological findings in support of the Yu dynasty means that this pre-Xia regime remains a legend. As such, the Yu dynasty has yet to gain widespread acceptance as a factual part of Chinese history, both within China and among Western scholars. No accurate timeframe has yet been assigned to the Yu dynasty.

Lineage
From the Records of the Grand Historian by Han official Sima Qian:

 Changyi (昌意) – Zhuanxu (颛顼) – Qiongchan (穷蝉) – Jingkang (敬康) – Gouwang (句望) – Qiaoniu (桥牛) – Gusou (瞽叟) – Chonghua, the Emperor Shun (帝舜 重华)

Use in Vietnam

The Hồ dynasty of Vietnam claimed descent from the Emperor Shun, through Duke Hu of Chen. The official name adopted by the Hồ state was Đại Ngu (大虞; lit. "Great Ngu"); "Ngu" is the Vietnamese variant of the Chinese character yú (虞).

See also
 History of China
 Timeline of Chinese history
 Dynasties in Chinese history
 Chinese historiography
 Three Sovereigns and Five Emperors

References 

Dynasties in Chinese history
Former countries in Chinese history